Esperance Senior High School is a comprehensive public high day and boarding school, located in Esperance, a regional centre  southeast of Perth, Western Australia.

A Pre-Vocational Rural Skills program and a Year 11 and 12 Primary Industry Studies Vocational Education and Training (VET) course are currently provided for students at the School Farm. There is also a farm demonstration block on the school site where lower school agricultural subjects are offered to students. The farm program allows educational programs for agricultural studies and equine studies.

The Esperance Community Education Campus (ECEC) is a further dimension of the school, representing a federation of the High School, the Esperance Senior High School Education Support Centre, the Vocational Training and Education Centre and the Esperance Residential College.

History
Founded in 1966, the school has grown from a small rural junior high school to a comprehensive senior high school with 880 students in 2012, approximately 7% of whom are Aboriginal. The school is set within the Esperance Community Education Campus, situated on 28 hectares (40 acres) of land in town and with an 800 hectare school farm situated 35 kilometres out of town.

In 2004, a $3.75 million upgrade of the north wing and the establishment of the Curtin Vocational Training and Education Centre (VTEC) enhanced the provision for practical subjects. The Fixing Our Schools program contributed $489,853 to the maintenance of buildings.

In 2006, the $7.53 million Junior Campus, with 18 classrooms catering for years 8 and 9 students, was built.

The Australian Government's Building the Education Revolution building program has funded the following building projects at the school in more recent times: a $5.1 million Trade Training Centre; a $200,000 National School Pride project extending connectivity between the Junior Campus and the rest of the school and enhancing canteen facilities; and a $1.9 million refurbishment of the science facilities. In addition, the State Government's Royalties for Regions grant funding provided $200,000 for industry-standard equipment for the Trade Training Centre.

The school hit the headlines in 2010 following an incident where a student took a loaded gun to school following an argument with another student.
The 15-year-old was persuaded to lay down his double-barrel shotgun by teachers and police after being spotted walking around the campus with the weapon and was then taken into custody. Lawyers representing the boy claimed the student snapped following years of bullying. This event marked the first time that a loaded weapon had been taken into a Western Australian school.

Enrolments at the school have been reasonably steady over the past few years with 932 in 2007, 1044 in 2008, 1063 in 2009, 925 in 2010, 887 in 2011 and 880 in 2012.

Staffing 

The school has a principal, two deputies, three program coordinators (Student Services, Agriculture and School Planning and Curriculum Development), two heads of learning areas in the arts and technology and enterprise - and five heads of department for English, mathematics, science, society and environment and health and physical education. As well, there are a number of teachers-in-charge of curriculum areas, including music, languages (French and Wangkatja), vocational education and training (VET), home economics, computing and business. A Follow the Dream coordinator, Clontarf Football Academy staff and Aboriginal and Islander Education Officers support the school's Aboriginal students, and a library manager oversees the Esperance Community Education Campus Library and Learning Centre.

There are approximately 80 teaching staff and 30 non-teaching staff at the school.

The Student Services Coordinator manages pastoral care and behaviour management programs, and supports students and those staff with specific responsibilities in the student services field. Other members of the Student Services team include three senior school year coordinators, three Junior Campus team leaders, the Aboriginal and Islander Education officers, the chaplain, the youth education officer, the faction leader, the nurse, the students-at-risk coordinator, mentors and the school psychologist.

Achievements 
2010:
Graduation Rate: 100%.
TER (Tertiary Entrance Rank) over 90%:  9 Students
Certificate of Excellence for 10 or more A grades in years 11 and 12: 3 students
Dux of Esperance Senior High School was also the Highest TEE Score Student Regional winner
Top Westscheme VET Student and Certificate of Distinction (VET Sport)
Wholly School Assessed (WSA) Subject Award
Medical Rural Bonded Scholarship
Rotary Student Exchange to Germany 2011
Subjects greater than State average: 14.
98% of students gained front door entry to university or a Certificate II or higher TAFE qualification.
The school was in the Top 50 Schools list for Vocational Education and Training (number 22 school in the State).

Esperance Senior High School: 2008 Whole School Literacy Award State Winner

The Tournament of Minds is a critical and creative thinking skills competition across Australia and the Pacific in the fields of mathematics/engineering, language literature and social sciences, with technology a recent addition.  Esperance Senior High School Tournament of Minds history:

The school won the champion school award in the 2008 senior schools country week carnival.

Residential college 
The residential college is located within the education precinct known as the Esperance Community College Campus and is in close proximity to the high school.
The college is able to accommodate 98 students and is equipped with indoor and outdoor recreation facilities. Students have access to tutors and computer access to the high school and library.

See also

 List of schools in rural Western Australia
 Education in Australia

References

External links
 http://www.esperanceshs.wa.edu.au/
 http://www.erc.edu.au/index.html

Public high schools in Western Australia
Educational institutions established in 1966
Boarding schools in Western Australia
1966 establishments in Australia
Esperance, Western Australia